Olof Peter Rickard Hallström (born 4 January 1973) is a Swedish curler and curling coach.

Hallström started playing curling in 1980. He plays in second position and is right-handed.

In 2008 he was inducted into the Swedish Curling Hall of Fame.

References

External links
 

1973 births
Living people
Swedish male curlers
Swedish curling champions
21st-century Swedish people